Myosotis rehsteineri is a species of flowering plant belonging to the family Boraginaceae.

Its native range is Alps.

References

External links 

rehsteineri